Werner Hunderup Hedegaard (2 March 1911 – 19 July 1975) was a Danish footballer. He played in one match for the Denmark national football team in 1934 during the 1933–36 Nordic Football Championship.

References

External links
 

1911 births
1975 deaths
Danish men's footballers
Denmark international footballers
Place of birth missing
Association footballers not categorized by position